The Roman Catholic Diocese of Port-Bergé is a diocese located in the city of Port-Bergé in the Ecclesiastical province of Antsiranana in Madagascar.

History
 October 18, 1993: Established as Diocese of Port-Bergé from the Roman Catholic Diocese of Mahajanga

Bishops
 Bishops of Port-Bergé (Roman rite)
 Bishop Armand Toasy (October 18, 1993 - December 15, 2013)
 Bishop Georges Varkey Puthiyakulangara, M.E.P. (December 15, 2013 – present)

Coadjutor Bishop
Georges Varkey Puthiyakulangara, M.E.P. (2008-2013)

See also
Roman Catholicism in Madagascar

Sources
 GCatholic.org
 Catholic Hierarchy
 Diocese of Port-Bergé official website

Roman Catholic dioceses in Madagascar
Christian organizations established in 1993
Roman Catholic dioceses and prelatures established in the 20th century
Roman Catholic Ecclesiastical Province of Antsiranana
1993 establishments in Madagascar